David B. Levine is an orthopaedic surgeon, hospital administrator, professor and historian of medicine who has held positions since 1961 at the Hospital for Special Surgery in New York City, New York.

Early life, education, and residencies

Levine was born to Sarah and Herbert Levine in 1932 in Binghamton, NY, and attended public schools there. He studied from 1950 to 1953 at Dartmouth College and graduated in 1957 with an M.D. degree from State University of New York Upstate Medical University at Syracuse.

From 1957 to 1958, he worked as a Rotating Intern at the Case Western Reserve's Metropolitan General Hospital in Cleveland, Ohio. From 1958 to 1959 he was an Assistant Surgical Resident at Beth Israel Hospital (now known as Beth Israel Deaconess Medical Center) in Boston, Massachusetts, and also during this year was an instructor in surgery at Harvard Medical School.

Practice at Hospital for Special Surgery 

During 1961–1964, Levine served as an Orthopaedic Resident at the Hospital for Special Surgery. In 1965–1966 he served as an orthopaedic spine fellow at the Rancho Los Amigos Hospital in Downey, California. From 1965 to 1966, he was a spine fellow at the Los Angeles General Hospital, where he was also an instructor in Orthopedic Surgery at the University of Southern California. In 1967, he was certified by the American Board of Orthopaedic Surgery.

From 1966 to 1995, Levine was on the attending staff at Hospital for Special Surgery (HSS), as an orthopaedic surgeon. He held the titles of Chief of the Scoliosis Service (1968–1995), and Director of the Department of Orthopedic Surgery (1987–1990). As Chairman of the Orthopedic Residency Training Program (1987–1990), he streamlined the application process, helping to introduce one of the first computerized scoring processes and adding a psychologist interview session.

He taught for over thirty years at Cornell University Medical College, and from 1978 to 1995 held the title of Professor of Clinical Orthopaedic Surgery at the Weill Cornell Medical College. From 1979 to 1982, Dr. Levine was an Alumni Council Trustee of the college.

In addition, he was a surgeon at The New York Hospital, and the Bronx Veterans Administration Hospital. From 1976 to 1980, he was Visiting Associate Physician at The Rockefeller University Hospital in New York City.

During his career, Levine published over 65 peer reviewed articles, 16 books and chapters and gave more than 300 invited presentations. He was the proposer of the Scoliosis Research Society in 1964, a founding member and its president from 1978 to 1979, serving on the board of directors for fifteen years. In 2010, the Society, now a highly recognized international organization, presented him with its "Lifetime Achievement Award."

In 2006, the hospital announced the creation of The David B. Levine Endowed Clinical Research Chair.

Historian of medicine and early immunotherapy research

In 1995, Levine retired from active patient care and the next year moved to Florence, Italy with his wife Janet, an artist, where he lectured at Careggi University Orthopaedic Hospital, studied antique furniture restoration and perfected his Italian cooking. He returned to New York in 1997, purchased a farm in Columbia County, New York, restored a 19th-century home, tended an organic garden, boarded black Angus cattle, cared for a raft of ducks, and a herd of homeless sheep and goats.

In 2003 Levine became the Director of the Alumni Association at Hospital for Special Surgery (HSS). In concert with the 150th anniversary of HSS he published the definitive history of the hospital in 2013 titled, Anatomy of a Hospital. History of the Hospital for Special Surgery, 1863–2013.

Levine has pursued history of medicine, and given presentations on medicine during the Civil War. From the beginning of the Civil War in April 1861, until the Confederate States surrendered in April 1865, the casualties and deaths on both sides were monumental, changing the face of medical care, resulting in the creation of the Army Medical Corps.

Levine has spoken about the history of cancer immunotherapy research at Hospital for Special Surgery. Dr. William Coley (January 12, 1862 – April 16, 1936), (the 3rd surgeon-in-chief at the hospital when it was called The Hospital for the Ruptured and Crippled) who developed Coley's Toxins, investigated the field.

Selected writings 

 Levine DB (2013). Anatomy of a Hospital. Hospital for Special Surgery 1863–2013.
 Anand N, Levine DB, Burke S, Bansal M. Neuropathic spinal atrophy in Charcot-Marie-Tooth disease. J Bone Joint Surg. 1997; 79-A:1235–39.
 Dhuper S, Ehlers KH, Fatica NS, Myridakis DJ, Klein AA, Friedman DM, Levine DB. Incidence and risk factors for mitral valve prolapse in severe adolescent idiopathic scoliosis. Pediatr Cardiol. 1997 Nov-Dec; 18(6):425 – 28. 
 Cole BJ, Flics S, Levine DB. Optimizing hospital reimbursement through physician awareness: A step toward better patient care. Orthopedics. Jan 1998; 21(1): 79 – 83. 
 Wilson PD Jr., Levine DB. Hospital for Special Surgery. A brief review of its development and current position. Clin Orthop. 2000 May; (374):90-105. 
 Levine DB. Hospital for Special Surgery. First site 1863–1870. Hospital for the Ruptured and Crippled. J HSS 2005 Sep; 1(1): 3–8. 
 Levine DB. The Hospital for the Ruptured and Crippled: Knight to Gibney, 1870–1887. J HSS 2006 Feb; 2(1):1-6.  
 Levine DB. Gibney as surgeon-in-chief: The earlier years, 1887–1900. J HSS 2006 Sep; 2(2):95-101. 
 Levine DB . The Hospital for the Ruptured and Crippled, Entering the twentieth century, ca. 1900 to 1912. J HSS 2007 Feb 3(1):2-12.
 Levine DB. The Hospital for the Ruptured and Crippled moves east on 42nd Street 1912 to 1925. J HSS 2007 Sep; 3(2):131-136.
 Levine DB. The Hospital for the Ruptured and Crippled: William Bradley Coley, third surgeon-in-chief 1925–1933. J HSS 2007 Feb; 4(1):1-9.
 Levine DB. The Hospital for the Ruptured and Crippled, Eugene H. Pool, fourth surgeon-in-chief 1933–1935, followed by Philip D. Wilson, fifth surgeon-in-chief 1935. J HSS 2008 Mar; 4(1):97-106.
 Levine DB. The Hospital for the Ruptured and Crippled renamed The Hospital for Special Surgery 1940; the war years 1941–1945.  J HSS 2009 Feb]; 5(1): 1–8.
 Levine DB. The Hospital for Special Surgery affiliates with Cornell University Medical College and New York Hospital, 1951; Philip D. Wilson retires as surgeon-in-chief, 1955. J HSS 2009 Sep; 5(2): 83–91.
 Levine DB. The Hospital for Special Surgery 1955 to 1972: T. Campbell Thompson serves as sixth surgeon-in-chief 1955–1963 followed by Robert Lee Patterson, Jr. the seventh surgeon-in-chief 1963–1972. J HSS 2010; 6: 1–13.
 Levine DB. The Hospital for Special Surgery 1972–1989; Philip D. Wilson, Jr., eighth surgeon-in-chief. J HSS 2010 Sep; 6(2): 119–133.
 Johanson NA, Levine DB. Obituary Henry Hubert Sherk MD (1930–2012). Clin Orthop Relat Res. 2013 Oct; 471(10): 3389–3390.
 Levine DB, Braun RM. Obituary: Ronald L. Linscheid MD (1929–2012). Clin Orthop Relat Res. 2013 Nov; 471(11): 3722–3723: 3722–3723.
 Levine DB. Obituary: John Phillip Nelson MD (1936–2013). Clin Orthop Relat Res. 2014 Jun; 472(6): 1996–1997.
 Levine DB, Obituary: William J. Kane, MD (1933–2015). Spine Deform 2015 Jul; 3(4): 287.
 Levine, DB. Origin & Early Years of the Scoliosis Research Society 1966–1979. Spine Deform 2015 Sep; 3(5): 392–401.

References

1932 births
Living people
American orthopedic surgeons
20th-century American physicians
Dartmouth College alumni
State University of New York Upstate Medical University alumni
Rockefeller University faculty
NewYork–Presbyterian Hospital physicians
Writers from Binghamton, New York
Physicians from New York (state)
United States Navy officers
History of medicine in the United States
21st-century American historians
21st-century American male writers
Physicians of Hospital for Special Surgery
Historians from New York (state)
American male non-fiction writers